Fong Po Kuan (born 15 September 1973) is a Malaysian politician from the Democratic Action Party (DAP) political party. She is able to communicate in Chinese, English, and Malay. She did her STPM in Anglo Chinese School, Ipoh in 1992.  After that she attended the International Islamic University Malaysia (IIUM) from 1993 to 1997, and graduated with a law degree.

Political career
In the 1999 general election, Fong won the Batu Gajah parliamentary seat in the Dewan Rakyat, and became the youngest female Member of Parliament (MP) in Malaysia. She won 19,867 out of 38,774 votes, winning by a majority of 2,071 with 67.5% turnout. During her first term, she was suspended for six months from Parliament without wages or allowances for criticising the Speaker of the House. Her suspension was unique in that the Speaker had waived the seven-day notice period required to raise the issue, and that the matter was never brought to the Parliamentary Committee of Privileges. The 83 MPs, all from the Speaker's party, who voted for suspension only constituted 43% of parliament; while this was a majority of those present in the hall, it did not have a simple majority of the total number of MPs. The suspension was widely seen to be vindictive.

In 2003, Fong inquired in parliament why she had been compelled to wear the tudung for her graduation ceremony at IIUM. The Parliamentary Secretary to the Ministry of Education, Mahadzir Mohammad Khir, stated wearing the tudung was encouraged but not mandatory. A year later, the IIUM Senate made it compulsory for female students to wear the tudung to their convocation ceremony.

In 2005, having noticed a few non-Muslim women wearing the tudung in the gallery, she raised a point of order about whether wearing the tudung was compulsory in Parliament. It was not.

Fong initially decided not to defend her seat in the 2008 general election. After DAP leaders asked her to reconsider, she finally agreed to run for re-election, retaining her Batu Gajah parliamentary seat for the third term with a majority of 24,627.

Election results

Personal life
Fong, 34, married Johor DAP organising secretary Tan Chen Choon, 38, on 12 January 2008 then. They organised a quiet wedding ceremony solemnised by Ipoh Chin Woo Association's assistant registrar Datuk Ooi Foh Sing. Her husband, Tan later became Johor State Assemblyman for Jementah in 2013 and 2018 general elections and also appointed as Johor's EXCO in 2019.

References

External links
 Official blog.

1973 births
Living people
People from Perak
Malaysian politicians of Chinese descent
Malaysian people of Cantonese descent
Malaysian Buddhists

Democratic Action Party (Malaysia) politicians
Members of the Dewan Rakyat
Women members of the Dewan Rakyat
Women in Perak politics
International Islamic University Malaysia alumni
20th-century Malaysian women politicians
21st-century Malaysian women politicians
20th-century Malaysian politicians
21st-century Malaysian politicians